The TEA1002 is a PAL video encoder chip produced by Mullard in 1982 and used on the Mattel Aquarius and AlphaTantel computers.
It was also used on teletext decoders and color bar generators associated with video test equipment

The chip is capable of displaying 320 x 192 pixels (within borders), 40x24 text blocks (with 8 x 8 pixel character block) and 80x72 addressable graphics.
It generates 16 colors based on Luminance, Chrominance and Saturation, usually with the 8 basic colors being similar to the EBU 75% color bars.

Levels
According to the TEA1002 datasheet, colors are formed by the combination of three signals: Luminance, Chrominance and Saturation. The following table lists the internal signals and shows an approximation of the generated colors, as seen on a web standard sRGB monitor. Colors could be different when seen on an analog PAL CRT television. 

Internally colors are stored in a 4 bit RGBI arrangement. There are three bits for the RGB components (generating 8 primary colors at full saturation but 75% luminance - similar to the EBU colour bars) and an inverter logic input bit that controls a variation of the base color (a 75% luminance decrease for white; a 50% chroma saturation decrease for all colors).

An alternate configuration of the chip allows it to output 95% luminance color bars - similar to BBC colour bars, more suited for usage in teletext decoders.

See also
 Thomson EF9345
 Motorola 6845
 TMS9918
 MOS Technology VIC-II
 List of home computers by video hardware

References

Graphics chips